Centrobranchus is a genus of lanternfishes.

Species
The currently recognized species in this genus are:
 Centrobranchus andreae (Lütken, 1892) (Andre's lanternfish)
 Centrobranchus brevirostris Becker, 1964
 Centrobranchus choerocephalus Fowler, 1904
 Centrobranchus nigroocellatus (Günther, 1873) (roundnose lanternfish)

References

Myctophidae
Marine fish genera
Taxa named by Henry Weed Fowler